Christine Moorman is the T. Austin Finch Professor, Sr. of Business Administration at Fuqua School of Business, Duke University. She is known for her work on marketing strategy, marketing organization and marketing research. She is a Fellow of the American Marketing Association. She is the Editor-in-Chief of the Journal of Marketing.

Books
Moorman, Christine and George S. Day Strategy from the Outside In: Profiting from Customer Value. McGraw Hill, 2010.

Selected research publications
Moorman, Christine, and George S. Day. "Organizing for marketing excellence." Journal of Marketing 80, no. 6 (2016): 6-35.
Moorman, Christine, Gerald Zaltman, and Rohit Deshpande. "Relationships between providers and users of market research: The dynamics of trust within and between organizations." Journal of Marketing Research 29, no. 3 (1992): 314.
Moorman, Christine, Rohit Deshpande, and Gerald Zaltman. "Factors affecting trust in market research relationships." Journal of Marketing (1993): 81–101.

Awards 
 Irwin-McGraw Hill Distinguished Marketing Educator 2018, American Marketing Association.

References

Duke University faculty
Marketing people
Fellows of the American Marketing Association
Living people
Year of birth missing (living people)
Journal of Marketing editors